Lasovians (Lasovian dialect: Lesioki)are a subethnic group of the Polish nation, who reside in Lesser Poland, at the confluence of the Vistula and the San rivers, Subcarpathian Voivodeship, southeastern Poland. They are descended from various ethnic groups, which settled in the dense Sandomierz Forest across centuries, with a dominant Polish element. The Lasowiacy were formed as a separate subethnic group in the late 19th and early 20th century. They use their own dialect, which belongs to Lesser Polish dialect cluster of the Polish language. Like most Poles, the Lasowiacy are Roman Catholics.

Area 
The area inhabited by the Lasowiacy ranges from Sandomierz and Nisko in the north, to Głogów Małopolski, Leżajsk,  and Ropczyce. According to Polish ethnographer Franciszek Kotula, their territory is much wider, reaching to Tarnogród, Janów Lubelski and Biłgoraj.

Origins 
The Lasowiacy were formed as a separate subethnic group in the 19th century. Sandomierz Forest, one of the largest forests in southern Poland, was for centuries sparsely inhabited. In the mid-14th century, King Kazimierz Wielki established several towns located on the edge of the forest. In the 16th century, settlers from Mazovia began to arrive here, founding several villages (e.g. Mazury). Furthermore, in the 16th and 17th centuries, upon royal orders, the forest was settled by prisoners of war from several countries, such as Swedish Empire, Crimean Khanate, Turkish Empire, Muscovy, Rus', Grand Duchy of Lithuania Wallachia, as well as German mercenaries, who served in different armies.

In the late 18th century, southern Lesser Poland and neighboring Red Ruthenia were annexed by the Habsburg Empire, as the newly created province of Galicia. Soon, first German-speaking settlers came to the Sandomierz Forest, during the action initiated by Emperor Joseph II. Furthermore, after the 1815 Congress of Vienna, the border between Austria and Russian Empire was established along the Vistula. As a result, inhabitants of the forest were for 100 years separated from Sandomierzanie, another local subethnic group, named after the town of Sandomierz, which deepened their isolation.

Language 
The Lasowiacy dialect (Polish gwara lasowiacka or gwara lasowska) belongs to the Lesser Poland dialect of the Polish language. Since the forest was settled by the Mazovians, the Lasowiacy dialect has several features of the Masovian dialect, such as mazurzenie. Melchior Wańkowicz in his 1939 book Sztafeta gives an interesting example of the Lasowiacy dialect. In 1938, he went to the Lasowiacy village of Pławo, where a brand new industrial town of Stalowa Wola was being built. Wańkowicz talked to local residents, writing in the book: "The people in this village call themselves Lasowiacy, speaking a funny accent, which sounds like a mix of Goral dialect, and the language of Kurpie".

Activities of the Lasowiacy 
Since bulk of the Lasowiacy inhabited the extensive forest, they supported themselves by forestry, with such activities, as hunting, honey making, tar making and production of charcoal. There also were skilled artisans – carpenters, coopers, pot makers, wicker workers, and weavers. Since parts of the forest were cleared and turned into farmfields, several kinds of cereal and vegetables are cultivated here. Local soil, however, is not fertile, allowing for cultivation of potatoes, beetroots, rye and oat.

Houses and clothes 
The Lasowiacy used to live in log cabins, with a number of them making hamlets, located in the woods. Their clothes were made of linen, with most popular colors white, black and red. The open-air museum in Kolbuszowa (formerly known as Regional Museum of the Lasowiacy) features several original examples of the Lasowiacy culture. In 1956, Dancing Ensemble Lasowiacy was created in Stalowa Wola.

Notes

References

External links 
 Webpage of the Lasowiacy Ensemble from Stalowa Wola 
 Lasowiacy dialect of the Polish language
 Lasowiacy at the webpage of the Center of Civic Education

See also 
 Lesser Poland

Polish traditions
Podkarpackie Voivodeship
Polish culture
Ethnic groups in Poland
Lesser Poland